Igor Pisanjuk  (born 24 October 1989) is a footballer who played in the Nemzeti Bajnokság I, Nemzeti Bajnokság II, and the Canadian Soccer League. Pisanjuk was born in Serbia and is of Ukrainian descent and has represented Canada at international level.

Club career
Born in Sremska Mitrovica, Serbia, Pisanjuk began his career with Erin Mills SC and in 2007 was the OSL Provincial West U21 leading goal scorer at the age of 17.

He joined Ferencváros in December 2007, signing his first professional contract. He scored his first two goals on 6 November 2008 against Kecskeméti TE and on 12 November 2008 against REAC. In the 2008–09 season, Ferencvaros were the champions of the Nemzeti Bajnokság II and were promoted to the Nemzeti Bajnokság I.

Pisanjuk was then loaned out to a NB2 team Szolnoki MÁV in February 2010. He had 13 appearances with 12 starts and 9 goals. That season Szolnok MAV were the champions of the NB2 and were promoted to the NB1. On 24 April 2011 he signed with Mississauga Eagles FC of the Canadian Soccer League. Midway through the season he was transferred to Kecskemeti TE.

On 13 February 2012, he signed to Egri FC in the Nemzeti Bajnokság II. He scored his first goal on 5 May 2012 against Ceglédi VSE. That season Egri FC won the Nemzeti Bajnokság II and were promoted to the Nemzeti Bajnokság I. Pisanjuk had 9 appearances and 2 goals that season. 

In 2012, he was in the ProStars FC academy in Canada, before being invited to a tryout in Romania.

In January 2013 signed for Vasas SC and played six goals for them, before in May 2013 he returned to Canada. Pisanjuk signed a contract on 25 May 2013 with Canadian Soccer League side Astros Vasas FC. Midway through the 2014 season he was appointed player/head coach, and led the Astros to the postseason by finishing fourth in the overall standings.

International career
On 12 November 2008 he was called to a Canada U-20 training camp in Switzerland, where he scored his first two goals for the under 20 national team on 24 November 2008 against Young Boys Bern II. On 23 February 2009, Pisanjuk was named to the Canada U-20 team competing in the CONCACAF World Cup Qualifying tournament in Trinidad and Tobago. He played on the Canadian Under 23 Olympic team.

Personal life
Pisanjuk grew up in Mississauga, Greater Toronto Area and from 2003 to 2007 attended Philip Pocock Catholic High School.

Honours
2007: OSL Provincial West U21 Leading Goal Scorers
2008–09 NB2 Champion with Ferencvárosi TC
2009–10 NB2 Champion with Szolnoki MÁV
2011–12 NB2 Champion with Egri FC

References

External links
 Profile
 Ferencvaros Profile

1989 births
Living people
Sportspeople from Sremska Mitrovica
Serbian people of Ukrainian descent
Serbian emigrants to Canada
Ukrainian footballers
Canadian soccer players
Association football forwards
Ferencvárosi TC footballers
Szolnoki MÁV FC footballers
Egri FC players
North York Astros players
Canadian expatriate soccer players
Expatriate footballers in Hungary
Canadian expatriate sportspeople in Hungary
Canada men's youth international soccer players
Canada men's under-23 international soccer players
Canadian Soccer League (1998–present) players
Mississauga Eagles FC players
Canadian soccer coaches
North York Astros coaches
Canadian Soccer League (1998–present) managers
Nemzeti Bajnokság II players
2009 CONCACAF U-20 Championship players
Canadian people of Ukrainian descent
Canadian people of Serbian descent
People from Sremska Mitrovica